Walter H. Abbott is a former American football player and coach, college athletics administrator, and university professor.  He served as the head football coach at the University of Maine from 1967 through 1975, compiling a record of a 27–53.  His Maine Black Bears football team won a share of Yankee Conference championship in 1974.  Abbott served two stints as interim athletic director at Maine, from  1991 to 1992 and again from 1994 to 1995, and was the coordinator of the football program in 1986 between the departure of Ron Rogerson and hiring of Buddy Teevens. He also was a member of the university's faculty until his retirement in 2010. Abbott is well known for creating and instructing the popular Outdoor Leadership (formerly Preparedness) course in which he introduced thousands of students to the beauty, ruggedness and adventure to be found in the state of Maine.

His son, Steve Abbott, served as the Chief of Staff to Senator Susan Collins and as interim athletic director at the University of Maine.

Head coaching record

References

Year of birth uncertain
1930s births
Living people
American football guards
American football linebackers
Maine Black Bears athletic directors
Maine Black Bears football coaches
Maine Black Bears football players
University of Maine faculty
People from Rumford, Maine
Coaches of American football from Maine
Players of American football from Maine